Epiphyllum thomasianum is an epiphytic species of cactus native to Colombia, Costa Rica, Guatemala, Honduras, Mexico, Nicaragua and Panamá.

Description
The vegetative morphology closely resembles Epiphyllum oxypetalum. The flowers differ due to their striking golden stamina.

Systematics
Currently two subspecies are recognised: Epiphyllum thomasianum subsp. costaricense and Epiphyllum thomasianum subsp. thomasianum.

References

External links

Night-blooming plants
thomasianum
Cacti of Mexico
Epiphytes